Elizabeth Blair Lee (June 20, 1818 – September 13, 1906) was an American woman who lived through the American Civil War, and wrote hundreds of letters describing the events of the times to her husband, Samuel Philips Lee.

Early life
Elizabeth Lee was born on June 20, 1818, in Frankfort, Kentucky to Francis Preston Blair and Eliza Violet Gist Blair. She was the sister of Montgomery Blair, James L. Blair, and Francis Preston Blair Jr. When the family moved to Blair House across the street from the White House, the President, Vice-President and Cabinet members were frequent guests. Elizabeth's best friend was President Andrew Jackson's young niece, Emily Donelson,  who served as First Lady for her uncle, whose wife had died.  Elizabeth lived in the White House one winter because of her health problems from dampness at Blair House. According to one version of the story, Elizabeth was present with her father when they chanced upon the silver-flecked spring which would inspire the name of the family's summer home in what would eventually become Silver Spring, Maryland. The spring site is memorialized at Silver Spring's Acorn Park though the water source was disrupted in the 1950s.

Marriage and family life
She married Rear Admiral Samuel Phillips Lee, a U.S. Navy officer during the Civil War, in 1844. Her letters to her husband, who was away for long periods as commander of the USS Philadelphia, describe wartime life in her homes of Washington, D.C. and Silver Spring, Maryland, during the war. Elizabeth was the mother of one child, Blair Lee, a U.S. senator from Maryland.

Death
She died on September 13, 1906, in Silver Spring.

References

1818 births
1906 deaths
People from Frankfort, Kentucky
Women in the American Civil War
Elizabeth
Blair family
People from Silver Spring, Maryland